Ottavio Acquaviva d'Aragona, seniore (1560–1612) was an Itaian Roman Catholic cardinal and archbishop.

Biography
He was born in Naples in 1560 to Duke Giovan Girolamo and Margherita Pio. He was a brother of Cardinal Giulio Acquaviva d'Aragona and Blessed Rodolfo Acquaviva, who was martyred in 1583 in the East Indies. Ottavio studied law at the University of Perugia, from which he received a doctorate in 1582.

He studied "belle lettere" and Greek at the University of Perugia and obtained a degree in utroque iure. Then he went to Rome and entered the Curia, initially as a referendum of the Supreme Court of the Apostolic Signatura. Between 1590 and 1591 he was major domo for Pope Gregory XIV. 

Pope Gregory XIV raised him to the rank of cardinal of the Catholic Church in the consistory of 6 March 1591 

and on 5 April of the same year he received the deaconage of St. George in Velabro. From 1593 to 1601 he was a legate of Avignon, but in 1597 returned to Rome. On 22 April 1602 he opted for the title of Saints John and Paul and on 5 June 1605 for that of Santa Prassede.  

On 18 Sep 1605, he was consecrated bishop by Roberto Francesco Romolo Bellarmino, Archbishop Emeritus of Capua, with Antonio Caetani (iuniore), Archbishop of Capua, serving as co-consecrator.

On 31 August 1605 he was elected archbishop of Naples, where he went at the end of November of that same year. He celebrated the diocesan synods of 1607, 1611 and 1612. 

He took part in four conclaves: that of 1591 which elected Pope Innocent IX, that of 1592 which elected Pope Clement VIII and both the conclaves of 1605 which elected Pope Leo XI and Pope Paul V. 

He died in Naples at the age of 52 and was buried in the Duomo.

Episcopal succession

References

1560 births
1624 deaths
17th-century Italian cardinals
Clergy from Naples
17th-century Italian Roman Catholic archbishops